For the purpose of acknowledging dedication and achievement as well as accomplishments which merit recognition for their credit to the mission of the Chaplain Corps, the following have been authorized to be conferred upon those individuals deemed to have demonstrated the highest standards of integrity and moral character, displayed an outstanding degree of professional competence, selflessly served Soldiers and Families, and contributed to the promotion of the Army Chaplaincy.

The character and meaning of all Chaplain Corps awards are exemplified in Nurture, Care and Honor competencies and "Live the Call" charge of the Chaplain Corps. Accordingly, only actions taken and support rendered "without which the mission of the Army Chaplain Corps would have been impaired," or "which was necessary to the continuance of or enhancement of the overall Army Chaplain Corps mission," and deeds of defined acts of Faithfulness, Humility, Selflessness, and Sacrifice should be considered. As a result, nominees of all awards must demonstrate the highest levels of integrity, moral character, effective commitment to religious or military professionalism, and personal demonstration of the Army and Sacred Values of the Chaplin Corps.

The Order of Martin of Tours

History
The Order of Martin of Tours is titled in honor of the religious experience of a soldier in the Roman army who was stationed in Gaul (modern-day-France). One day as he was approaching the gates of the city of Amiens, he met a scantily clad beggar and impulsively cut his military cloak in half to share with the man. That night, Martin dreamed of Jesus wearing the half-cloak he had given away, He heard Jesus say to the angels: “Martin, who is still but a catechumen, clothed me with this robe.” (Sulpicius, ch 2). In another version, when Martin woke, he found his cloak restored to wholeness. The dream confirmed Martin in his piety, and he was baptized at the age of 18.

The part of the cloak he kept became a famous relic preserved in the oratory of the Merovingian kings of the Franks at the Marmoutier Abbey near Tours. During the Middle Ages, the supposed relic of St. Martin's miraculous cloak (cappa Sancti Martini) was carried by the king even into battle, and used as a holy relic upon which oaths were sworn. The cloak is first attested to in the royal treasury in 679, when it was conserved at the palatium of Luzarches, a royal villa that was later ceded to the monks of Saint-Denis by Charlemagne, in 798/99. During the Middle Ages, the relic of St. Martin's miraculous cloak, (cappa Sancti Martini) was carried by kings into battle and utilized in the swearing of oaths.

The priest who cared for the cloak in its reliquary was called a cappellanu, and ultimately all priests who served the military were called cappellani. The French translation is chapelains, from which the English word chaplain is derived. A similar linguistic development took place for the term, referring to the small temporary churches built for the relic. People called them a "capella", the word for a little cloak. Eventually, such small churches lost their association with the cloak, and all small churches began to be referred to as "chapels".

Eligibility
The Order of Martin of Tours has two levels:

The Honorable Order of Martin of Tours is awarded to those chaplains and Religious Affairs Specialists who have demonstrated the highest standards of integrity and moral character, displayed an outstanding degree of professional competence, selflessly served Soldiers and Families, and contributed to the promotion of the Army Chaplaincy. The Honorable Order of Martin of Tours may be conferred upon any currently serving or retired Chaplain or Religious Affairs Specialist from all components who meet these standards in the active support of Army Chaplaincy programs or missions during the previous calendar year. This award is only bestowed on an individual once.
The Ancient Order of Martin of Tours is reserved for Chaplains and Religious Affairs Specialists who achieve long-term, exceptional service to the Army Chaplaincy, surpassing even Honorable Order of Martin of Tours recipients. Such exceptional service must include extraordinary achievements and recognized service of Chaplains and Religious Affairs Specialists who promote the objectives and purposes of the Chaplain Corps. The Ancient Order of Martin of Tours may be conferred upon any currently serving or retired Chaplain or Religious Affairs Specialist from all components who meet these standards in the past 10 years who have demonstrated exceptional religious support leadership.

The Four Chaplains Medal

The Four Chaplains Medal, not to be confused with the Four Chaplains' Medal, a Commemorative decoration awarded posthumously to the medal's namesake, is a regimental award for excellence in service for an achievement or a shorter duration than both levels of the Order of Martin of Tours.

History
The award is named for The Four Chaplains, also referred to as the "Immortal Chaplains" or the "Dorchester Chaplains", who died rescuing civilian and military personnel as the troopship  sank on February 3, 1943. The Four Chaplains each helped other Soldiers board lifeboats and gave up their own life jackets when the supply ran out. The chaplains gathered on deck, joined arms, said prayers, and sang hymns as the ship went down.

The Four Chaplains Medal recognizes exceptional impact made by Army chaplains of all components (active, guard, and reserve) who best exemplify exceptional courage, personal sacrifice, teamwork, religious calling, and the Army Values in dealing with Soldiers, Commanders, Families, and the Army.

Eligibility
The character and meaning of The Four Chaplains award is exemplified in the professional and religious commitment of Chaplains’ Alexander Goode, George Fox, Clark Poling, and John Washington. Placing the welfare of soldiers above their own, with common sacrificed, they gave their life jackets to soldiers and continue to minister until the ship sank beneath the waves. Accordingly, only ministry actions taken and selfless support rendered on behalf of Soldiers and Families that greatly impact the local or extended Army community are taken into consideration.

The award is given for collegial selfless behavior while rendering religious support to the military community regardless of faith or race in keeping with the spirit of the sacrifice of the Four Chaplains.

SSG Christopher Stout Medal

Staff Sergeant Christopher Stout was the first Religious Affairs Specialist Killed in Action since the Vietnam War. A military professional of the highest caliber, SSG Stout was known by others as a brother and a shield of armor. His devotion and love for his fellow paratroopers epitomize the spirit of the Army Chaplain Corps. Assigned to 1st Battalion, 508th Parachute Infantry Regiment, 4th Brigade Combat Team, 82nd Airborne Division, Fort Bragg, North Carolina; SSG Stout Died on 13 July 2010 in Kandahar City, Afghanistan, of wounds sustained when insurgents attacked his unit with rocket-propelled grenades and small-arms fire.

Eligibility
The SSG Christopher Stout Medal is an annual award that recognizes those Noncommissioned Officers and Soldiers who best exemplify its namesake's contributions and values in their dealings with Soldiers, Commanders, Family members, and the Army during the previous calendar year.

Criteria
This award is given to Religious Affairs Specialists who emulate SSG Stout's legacy as a Soldier, leader, and person of character, creatively shaping the environment by technical expertise and proficient warrior tasks in religious support operations for the unit and the mission. Nominees must demonstrate enhancement of three core capabilities: Integrated religious operations, spiritual readiness, and basic human interaction in the total JIIM battle space at the tactical, operational, and strategic levels. In addition, nominees must demonstrate initiatives that greatly enhance religious support capabilities.

Order of Martha Washington Award

History
The character and meaning of the Order of Martha Washington Award is exemplified in her actions as general George Washington's spouse during the Revolutionary War. When general Washington took command of the Continental Army, Martha Washington was suddenly responsible for child-rearing, guest hospitality, and supervision of the family estate. In addition to her estate responsibilities, she became a critical support for her husband when he was in camp by volunteering to manage the food and social events of his headquarters and serving as his sounding board and closest confidant. Martha Washington also became her husband's secretary and representative at official functions. Finally, Martha nursed sick Soldiers in camp and acted as a liaison between General Washington and other officials. Accordingly, this award recognizes those spouse actions that provide exceptional support to the military member where their absence, we have impaired the mission of the Army Chaplain Corps.

Eligibility
This award may be presented to Chaplains, Religious Affairs Specialists, or DA Civilian spouses who have made significant contributions over an extended period of time through active support of Army-wide chaplain program and ongoing military Religious Support missions.

Order of Aaron and Hur

History
The Order of Aaron and Hur is the oldest Chaplain Corps award, the character and meaning of the exemplified in "supporting the arms" of the Chaplain Corps. Accordingly, the Order affords special recognition to individuals who have made outstanding contributions to the spiritual welfare of the men and women of the US Army and where exceptional actions are taken and support rendered  "without which the mission of the Army Chaplain Corps would have been impaired" or "which was necessary to the continuance of or enhancement of the overall Army Chaplain Corps mission."

Eligibility
This award may be presented to either non-branch military or civilian nominees who made a significant contribution over an extended period of time through active support of either local or Army-wide chaplain-led Religious Support programs.

Wear and Display

Department of the Army Regulations
While most branch awards and their criteria for merit are maintained by veteran associations and honor societies, albeit current and former service members, they are non-military civilian organizations; Chaplain Corps awards are conferred upon personnel by the authority and approval of the Chief of Chaplains. Though, technically, regulation prevents ordinary wear of awards below Headquarters, Department of the Army level or their reflection on record briefs. Regimental Awards are typically worn at formal functions, balls or dinings-in and dinings-out, Ceremonial and social occasions, or unless directed by a commander in accordance with Army Regulation 670-1, para 22–2, medallions are worn at the option of the wearer, when not prohibited, during normal duty hours.

In a similar tradition and manner that personnel wear the Sergeant Audie Murphy medallion on appropriate uniforms
when off duty. Personnel are encouraged to wear regimental neck medals and medallions on
the service, dress, and mess uniforms.
 
Dress Uniform:

Formal Corps functions:

Civilian Attire:

When Wearing Awards is Prohibited:

While the regulations governing branch awards, the Sergeant Audie Murphy Award and wear of the Stetson do not appear in the Army Regulation governing wear and appearance of uniforms and insignia, Major Commands, such as TRADOC and FORSCOM have published their own regulations authorizing and outlining their wear. (FORSCOM Regulation 600-80-1) 
(TRADOC Regulation 600-21)

See also

 Chaplain Corps (United States Army)
 Musicians of the Titanic – lost at sea as RMS Titanic sank in 1912
Regimental association awards
Order of the Spur - Cavalry
Order of St. Joan D'Arc Medallion - Cavalry (spouses)
 General Winfield Scott Medallion - Civil Affairs & Special Forces
 Order of Lewis and Clark - Civil Affairs 
 Saint George Award - Armor
 Order of Saint Michael - Aviation
 De Fleury Medal - Engineers
 Order of Saint Barbara - Field Artillery
 Order of Saint Maurice - Infantry
 Order of Military Medical Merit (O2M3) - Medical
 Thomas Knowlton Award - Military Intelligence
 Order of the Marechausse - Military Police
 Samuel Sharpe Award - Ordnance Corps
 Order of Mercury - Signal Corps
 Saint Philip Neri - Special Forces
Military Order of Saint Martin - Quartermaster Corps
Order of Saint Christopher - Transportation Corps Regimental Association

References

External links
 
 
 
 
 
 
 
 
 
 
 Decorations and Medals - Ribbons - Order of Precedence at the Institute of Heraldry website
 U.S. Army Symbols and Insignia
 The Institute of Heraldry, U.S. Army
 Wear and Appearance of Army Uniforms and Insignia (in PDF format)
 Military Awards (U.S. Army) (in PDF format)

Chaplain Corps (United States Army)
United States military chaplaincy
Devices and accouterments of United States military awards
 
Armed Forces
United States military-related lists